Rajala is a Finnish surname. Notable people with the surname include:

Anders Rajala (1891–1957), Finnish wrestler
Howard Rajala (born 1962), Canadian curler 
Jukka Rajala (born 1982), Finnish alpine skier 
Juuso Rajala (born 1988), Finnish ice hockey player 
Lembit Rajala (born 1970), Estonian football striker
Sameli Rajala (1858–1948), Finnish farmer, lay preacher and politician
Sarah Rajala, American engineer
Toni Rajala (born 1991), Finnish ice hockey forward 
Ville Rajala (born 1989), Finnish ice hockey player 

Finnish-language surnames